Rhododendron augustinii, called the blue rhododendron or Augustine's rhododendron, is a species of flowering plant in the genus Rhododendron native to central China and Tibet. Its Electra Group has gained the Royal Horticultural Society's Award of Garden Merit.

Subspecies
The following subspecies are currently accepted:
Rhododendron augustinii subsp. chasmanthum (Diels) Cullen

References

augustinii
Endemic flora of China
Plants described in 1889